The Tatra 97 (T97) is a Czechoslovak mid-size car built by Tatra in Kopřivnice, Moravia from 1936 to 1939.

History
The Tatra 97 was designed to complement two full-size cars in the Tatra range: the Tatra 77 launched in 1934 and the Tatra 87 launched in 1936 along with the Type 97. Each of the three models has an air-cooled rear engine and share similar aerodynamic fastback four-door sedan bodies. But whereas types 77 and 87 each have a large V8 engine, Type 97 has a flat-four engine. The Type 97 is distinguished by having two headlights and a one-piece windscreen, whereas the 77 and 87 have three headlights and a three-piece windscreen.

Tatra already had a mid-size car in the same class, the more conventional 1,688 cc Tatra 75 that it had launched in 1933. Tatra continued to produce the Type 75 alongside the futuristic Type 97. In fact production of the Type 75 outlived that of the Type 97 and continued until 1942.

Kopřivnice is in a part of northern Moravia that Nazi Germany annexed after the Munich Agreement in September 1938. Production of the Type 97 was terminated in 1939, possibly to avoid comparison with the KdF-Wagen (see below). Production of the Type 97 was 508 cars in total. In 1946 Tatra resumed car production, and replaced the Type 97 with the larger and more modern Tatra 600 "Tatraplan".

Resemblance to Volkswagen KdF-Wagen
In both streamlined design and technical specifications, especially the engine design and position, the Type 97 has a striking resemblance to Volkswagen's KdF-Wagen. However Tatra 97 itself does not appear original, as it has resemblance to sketches by Hungarian engineer Bela Barenyi, conceived in the 1920s and published in 1934. In any case Adolf Hitler is reported to have encountered and said of Tatra's cars; "This is the car for my roads". Ferdinand Porsche was accused of using Tatra designs to design the Volkswagen quickly and cheaply.  In Porsche's words; "Well, sometimes Ledwinka looked over my shoulder and sometimes I looked over his". 

Tatra sued Porsche for damages, and Porsche was willing to settle. But Hitler cancelled this, saying he "would settle the matter". Soon after Germany occupied the Sudetenland, Tatra stopped production of the Type 97 and the lawsuit was discontinued. After the Second World War Tatra resumed its lawsuit. In 1965 Volkswagen settled it by paying Tatra  in compensation.

Gallery (selected)

References
Streamlined Tatras
Tatra V570 1931, 1933
Tatra 77 1933–38
Tatra 87 1936–50
Tatra 97 1936–39
Tatra 600 Tatraplan 1946–52
Tatra 603 1956–75

Bibliography

External links

Cars powered by boxer engines
Cars introduced in 1936
Cars of the Czech Republic
Rear-engined vehicles
Rear-wheel-drive vehicles
97